Santa Rosa Mall can refer to the following:

Santa Rosa Mall (Florida) in Mary Esther, Florida
Santa Rosa Mall (Puerto Rico) in Bayamón, Puerto Rico
Santa Rosa Plaza in Santa Rosa, California